The Black Ice is the second novel by American crime author Michael Connelly, featuring the Los Angeles detective Hieronymus "Harry" Bosch.

Plot
In the book, narcotics officer Calexico (named after the place Calexico)  Moore's body is discovered on Christmas night in a seedy Hollywood motel, from an apparent suicide. It was rumored that he had been involved in the selling of a new drug called "Black Ice".  As the L.A. police higher-ups converge on the scene to protect the department from scandal, Harry Bosch inserts himself into the investigation. The trail he follows leads to Mexican drug gangs operating across the border while he gets attracted to Calexico Moore's widow as the case progresses. 

The "Black Ice" drug is a fictional drug invented by Connelly for his novel.

Potential Film Adaptation
In the early 1990's, Mace Neufeld, a Producer for Paramount Pictures at the time, acquired the film rights for the Novel, and hired Screenwriter Scott Rosenberg to pen the script, with John Travolta being looked at for the lead role, several directors were considered, including Oliver Stone, John Frankenheimer, Steven Soderbergh, and Paul Verhoeven.

References

Harry Bosch series
1993 American novels
Novels set in Los Angeles
Little, Brown and Company books
Works about Mexican drug cartels